Węgorzyce  is a settlement in the administrative district of Gmina Osina, within Goleniów County, West Pomeranian Voivodeship, in north-western Poland.

The settlement has a population of 220.

References

Villages in Goleniów County